Dimorphicosmia is a genus of moths of the family Noctuidae.

Species
 Dimorphicosmia variegata (Oberthür, 1879)

References

Natural History Museum Lepidoptera genus database
Dimorphicosmia at funet

Xyleninae